The 1892 Chelmsford by-election was a parliamentary by-election held for the British House of Commons constituency of Chelmsford in Essex on 30 April 1892.  The seat had become vacant on the death of the Conservative Member of Parliament William Beadel, who had held the seat since its creation for the 1885 general election.

The Conservative candidate, Thomas Usborne, was returned unopposed, and held the seat until he stood down at the 1900 general election.

See also 
 Chelmsford (UK Parliament constituency)
 1908 Chelmsford by-election
 1926 Chelmsford by-election
 1945 Chelmsford by-election
 The town of Chelmsford
 List of United Kingdom by-elections

References 

 

1892 elections in the United Kingdom
1892 in England
1890s in Essex
April 1892 events
Politics of the City of Chelmsford
By-elections to the Parliament of the United Kingdom in Essex constituencies
Unopposed by-elections to the Parliament of the United Kingdom in English constituencies